Tove Welle Haugland (born 13 November 1989) is a Norwegian politician for the Christian Democratic Party.

She served as a deputy representative to the Parliament of Norway from Vest-Agder during the term 2017–2021. She hails from Øvrebø, but is an elected councillor in Kristiansand and was acting deputy mayor in 2018.

References

1989 births
Living people
People from Vennesla
Deputy members of the Storting
Christian Democratic Party (Norway) politicians
Politicians from Kristiansand
Norwegian women in politics
Women members of the Storting
21st-century Norwegian politicians